A non-commissioned member (NCM), in the Canadian Armed Forces, is defined in the Queen's Regulations and Orders as: "... any person, other than an officer, who is enrolled in, or who pursuant to law is attached or seconded otherwise than as an officer to, the Canadian Forces..." Thus, an NCM is any member who is not a commissioned officer or officer cadet. Officer cadets, while not commissioned members, are classified as officers.

The equivalent term in French is "militaire du rang".

Canadian "Non-Commissioned Members" (NCM) are skilled personnel that provide operational and support services in the CAF. They start out as recruits, and are trained to do specific jobs.

Composition
Non-commissioned members comprise the following groups of ranks:

Non-commissioned officers are further subdivided into "junior non-commissioned officers" (Jr NCOs), consisting of the ranks of MCpl/MS and Cpl/LS, and "senior non-commissioned officers" (Sr NCOs), consisting of Sgt/PO2.

The ranks of MCpl/MS (MCpl/MS is an appointment given to a Cpl) and below are also collectively known as "junior ranks" (JRs). There is no equivalent simple collective term for Sgt/PO2 and above; they are generally known by the terms "Warrant Officers and Sergeants" (Army and Air Force) and "Chiefs and Petty Officers" or "Chiefs and POs" (Navy); the term "Senior NCM" is often erroneously used, and currently has no official sanction, although its use (and other unofficial terms like "junior NCMs") are appearing in official documentation with increasing frequency.

Analogues
In the British Army, Royal Marines and Royal Air Force (and in the armies and air forces of many other Commonwealth countries), the equivalent term is "Other Rank" (OR); in the Royal Navy and Commonwealth navies, the term is usually "rating" or "rate".

In the United States Army, Air Force and Marines, the equivalent term is "enlisted rank." In the United States Navy, the proper term is "rate" only; "rating" refers to a sailor's Military Occupational Specialty.

See also
 Enlisted rank
 Naval rating
 Non-commissioned officer
 Other ranks

References

Military ranks of Canada
Military of Canada